The Boxing Tournament at the 1990 Central American and Caribbean Games was held in Mexico City, Mexico from November 24 to December 3, 1990.

Medal winners

References
Amateur Boxing

C
1990 Central American and Caribbean Games
Boxing at the Central American and Caribbean Games